Adam Gillen (born 11 September 1985, Manchester) is a British actor, best known for his role as Liam Conroy in the ITV hit series Benidorm, Brian in the Channel 4 comedy Fresh Meat and Gavin in BBC's Prisoners’ Wives. In 2019, Gillen was nominated for an Olivier Award
for Best Actor in a Supporting Role in Killer Joe.

Early life
Gillen studied acting at Stockport College, before going on to graduate from the Royal Academy of Dramatic Arts in 2007.

Career
In 2000, Gillen was nominated for a TMA Award for Best Supporting Performance in a play for the Royal Exchange Theatre Company's A Taste of Honey. In 2011 he appeared as Moses in The School for Scandal.

Gillen is best known for his role as Liam in Benidorm from 2011 to its conclusion in 2018. Gillen's other television work includes The Gemma Factor, Oliver Twist, Just William and The Sarah Jane Adventures. In 2010, Gillen appeared in Noel Clarke’s 4.3.2.1.. He appeared in Age of Heroes in 2011.

In 2014, Gillen appeared in Lotty's War (written by Giuliano Crispini and directed by Bruce Guthrie) at the Yvonne Arnaud Theatre, Guildford.

In October 2016, he appeared as Mozart in the National Theatre production of Peter Shaffer's Amadeus and reprised the role when the production returned from February to April 2018. A filmed performance was later used in 2020 as part of the National Theatre at Home online series. Filmed from the Olivier Theatre.

In 2022, Gillen starred as the title role in William Shakespeare and John Fletcher's Henry VIII, performed at Shakespeare's Globe theatre, London. The production garnered mixed reviews from critics.

Filmography

Theatre

References

External links

National Theatre - Company Members - Adam Gillen

1985 births
English male television actors
Male actors from Manchester
Living people
Alumni of RADA